Caerleon Association Football Club is an association football club based in the Roman village of Caerleon on the northern outskirts of the City of Newport, South Wales. The team currently play in the Gwent County League Premier Division, which is at the fourth tier of the Welsh football league system.

The club's crest depicts the former Roman legionary fortress at Caerleon. The name of the home ground, Cold Bath Road, has Roman origins and is close to several Roman architectural remains.

Club history

Caerleon joined the Welsh Football League in the 1965–66 season when they were Division 2 champions and also won the Welsh Amateur Cup, beating Welshpool in the final at Llanidloes. Caerleon were also Division 1 champions in 1967–68. Caerleon played in the top division of the Welsh League until relegation in 1977.

Caerleon were promoted again to the top division after the 1978–80 season when they were runners-up in the league. The following five seasons were successful as they finished in the top five league positions three times.

Caerleon retained their place in the top division until relegation came after the 1988–89 season. The club reached its lowest point when further relegations in 1995–96 and 1996–97 seasons left them in the Welsh League Division 3.

Fortunes turned with back-to-back promotions in 1998–99 and 1999–00. Caerleon were at last back in the top division; the Welsh Football League First Division. An unlikely success also came in the 1999-00 Welsh Cup when Caerleon reached the quarter-final, losing 4–1 at home to Bangor City.

Caerleon resided in the Welsh Football League Division One for numerous seasons but were relegated to Division Two for the 2010–11 season. They finished in third place in Division Two in the 2011–12 season and were promoted back to Division One.

Honours

Leagues
Welsh Football League
Division One – Champions: 1967–68
Division Two – Champions: 1965–66
Division Three – Champions: 1998–99
Mon Senior League
Division One – Winners: 1959–60
Newport and District Football League
Premier 'X' – Champions: 1950–51, 1952–53

Cups
Welsh Amateur Cup
Winners: 1965–66
Monmouthshire/Gwent Senior Cup
Winners: 1993–94
Monmouthshire Amateur Cup
Winners: 1954–55, 1963–64, 1965|66
Monmouthshire County F.A. Youth Cup
Winners: 1970–71
Woodcock Cup:
Winners: 1907

Staff
 Manager:  Nicky Davies
 Manager:  Dave Griffiths
 Youth Team Manager:  James Rayner

References

External links
Caerleon Junior Youth FC
1959–60 Monmouthshire Senior League Division 1 Winners, team photo
Late 1950s team Photo

Football clubs in Wales
Football clubs in Newport, Wales
Association football clubs established in 1868
1868 establishments in Wales
Caerleon
Gwent County League clubs
Welsh Football League clubs
South Wales League clubs
Newport and District League clubs